"Stole My Heart" may refer to:

Stole My Heart (One Direction song)
"Stole My Heart" Megha (singer) from Singam